Haa Alif Atoll - officially referred as Thiladhunmathi Uthuruburi (Northern Thiladhunmathi Atoll) is the northernmost administrative division of the Maldives.

As the administrative division known as Haa Alif it includes Ihavandhippolhu, the northernmost natural atoll of the Maldive archipelago, as well as a section of the larger Thiladhunmathi or Tiladummati Atoll. Thiladhunmathi was divided into its northern and southern divisions on May 21, 1958. The north division was integrated with Ihavandhippolhu forming administratively a new atoll called Haa Alif atoll or Thiladhumathi North. In total Haa Alif atoll contains 42 islands, 14 of which are inhabited. There are three tourist resorts in the atoll. North Thiladhunmath is third largest atoll in the Maldives in terms of population and land area.

The atoll being at the north tip of the Maldives is the closest to Sri Lanka and India.

Northern Thiladhunmathi Atoll contains 42 islands, 16 of which are inhabited.

NOTE: Haa Alifu, Haa Dhaalu, Shaviyani, Noonu, Raa, Baa, Kaafu, etc. are code letters assigned to the present administrative divisions of the Maldives. They are not the proper names of the natural atolls that make up these divisions. Some atolls are divided into two administrative divisions while other divisions are made up of two or more natural atolls. The order followed by the code letters is from North to South, beginning with the first letters of the Thaana alphabet used in Dhivehi. These code letters are not accurate from the geographical and cultural point of view. However, they have become popular among tourists and foreigners in the Maldives who find them easier to pronounce than the true atoll names in Dhivehi, (save a few exceptions, like Ari Atoll).

History

In Matheerah there is a famous shrine (ziyaraiy, mausoleum) which was visited formerly by the Maldive kings and their families in order to seek blessings. Such tomb visits are aspects of Sufism that existed among the Maldivians until very recent times. Hence this island was referred to with the honorific title Matheerahffulhu (High (noble) Island) by the Sufi Muslims of the Maldives at that time.

Traditionally the northernmost atoll of the Maldives was Minicoy (Maliku).  Fishermen from Thuraakunu and from Minicoy often crossed the Maliku Kandu on their boats to visit each other's islands. Marriage alliances were common. Now Minicoy is a part of India and communication is highly restricted.

References

 Divehi Tārīkhah Au Alikameh. Divehi Bahāi Tārikhah Khidmaiykurā Qaumī Markazu. Reprint 1958 edn. Malé 1990.
 Divehiraajjege Jōgrafīge Vanavaru. Muhammadu Ibrahim Lutfee. G.Sōsanī.
 Xavier Romero-Frias, The Maldive Islanders, A Study of the Popular Culture of an Ancient Ocean Kingdom. Barcelona 1999.

Atolls of the Maldives
Administrative atolls of the Maldives